Aq Qaleh (also Romanized as Āq Qal‘eh; also known as Āg Qal‘eh) is a village in Maraveh Tappeh Rural District, in the Central District of Maraveh Tappeh County, Golestan Province, Iran. At the 2006 census, its population was 375, in 73 families.

References 

Populated places in Maraveh Tappeh County